Prince Alfred Bay is a waterway in Qikiqtaaluk Region, Nunavut, Canada. It lies off the western coast of Devon Island, forming a border of the Grinnell Peninsula, in the eastern high Arctic. Like Pioneer Bay to the south, it is an arm of Wellington Channel.

Geography
Prince Alfred Bay's southern coast is characterized by rugged hills.

References

Further reading
 Morrow, D. W., & Kerr, J. W. (1977). Stratigraphy and sedimentology of Lower Paleozoic formations near Prince Alfred Bay, Devon Island. Ottawa, Canada: Geological Survey of Canada.
 Morrow, D. W., & Kerr, J. W. (1986). Geology of Grinnell Peninsula and the Prince Alfred Bay area, Devon Island, District of Franklin, Northwest Territories. Ottawa: Geological Survey of Canada.

Bays of Qikiqtaaluk Region